Daniel Rebolledo Sepúlveda (October 5, 1848 – January 22, 1908) was a Chilean Army sergeant, who fought in the War of the Pacific.

Chilean Army enlisted personnel
1848 births
1908 deaths